Anobrium is a genus of longhorn beetles of the subfamily Lamiinae, containing the following species:

 Anobrium fasciatum Galileo & Martins, 2002
 Anobrium fraterculum Galileo & Martins, 2002
 Anobrium leuconotum Galileo & Martins, 2002 
 Anobrium luridum (Breuning, 1940)
 Anobrium minimum Martins, Galileo & de Oliveira, 2009
 Anobrium oberthueri Belon, 1902
 Anobrium punctatum Galileo & Martins, 2002
 Anobrium rugosicollis Galileo & Martins, 2002
 Anobrium simplicis Galileo & Martins, 2002

References

Pteropliini
Cerambycidae genera